Uwe Backes (born 2 February 1960 in Greimerath) is a German political scientist and specialist in political extremism. Backes is an adherent of the classical German theory of extremism (Extremismustheorie) that postulates that the extreme right and the extreme left have much in common in their opposition to liberty and democracy.

References 

German political scientists
1960 births
Living people